is a railway station in Setagaya, Tokyo, Japan, operated by the private railway operator Keio Corporation.

Lines

In addition, "meidai" in the station name is an abbreviation for Meiji University, from which the station is named, and "mae" indicates spatial proximity, similar to "front" in English.

Station layout

Meidaimae Station has three floors:
2F: Keio Line platforms
1F: Ticket gates
B1F: Keio Inokashira Line platforms

Both lines have two opposing side platforms serving two sets of tracks.

There are upward-only escalators between the Inokashira Line platforms and the concourse. Between the Inokashira Line platform and the Keiō Line platform, on the east end is an upward-only escalator, and on the west end is a downward-only escalator. There are elevators between the Inokashira Line Kichijoji-bound platform and the concourse, between the concourse and the Keio line down platform, between the Inokashira Line Shibuya-bound platform and the concourse, and between the concourse and the Keio Line up line platform.

There are toilets on the first floor, inside the ticket gates, including multi-purpose toilets.

On March 31, 2007, a new ticket gate was opened in the middle section of the Inokashira Line Kichijoji-bound platform, called . This exit is exit-only, and connects directly to the shopping building , connected to the station, which opened on May 24 of the same year, run by the Keio Group. The roof covering the Kichijoji-bound platform is attached to the first floor of this building. Additionally, some of the Frente Meidaimae stores are on (that is, face and open onto) the Kichijoji-bound platform.

In February 2001, a solar panel system was installed on the station roof, with the electricity generated used to power the lights in the station. This system was installed with cooperation from the New Energy and Industrial Technology Development Organization, and generates up to 30 kW.

Platforms

History
This was renamed  in 1917, and again renamed Meidaimae on 8 February 1935. The Inokashira Line platforms opened on 1 August 1933.

From 22 February 2013, station numbering was introduced on Keio lines, with Meidaimae Station becoming "KO06" on the Keio Line and "IN08" on the Inokashira Line.

Surrounding area
 Meiji University Izumi Campus

References

External links

 Meidaimae Station information (Keio) 

Railway stations in Japan opened in 1913
Keio Line
Keio Inokashira Line
Stations of Keio Corporation
Railway stations in Tokyo
Railway stations at university and college campuses